Nicotiana occidentalis subsp. hesperis is a short-lived herb native to Australia.

Description
It grows as an erect annual or short-lived perennial herb, from ten to 50 centimetres high, with white flowers.

Taxonomy
It was first published in 1960 by Nancy Tyson Burbidge, who give it species rank as Nicotiana hesperis. In 1981, Philippa Horton demoted it to a subspecies of Nicotiana occidentalis.

Distribution and habitat
It is endemic to Western Australia, being fairly widespread through mid-latitude parts. It is most common along the coast, but is also found well inland, such as north of Kalgoorlie.

References

occidentalis subsp. hesperis
Solanales of Australia
Eudicots of Western Australia
Plant subspecies
Tobacco
Tobacco in Australia